James Harrison "Babe" McCarthy (October 1, 1923 – March 17, 1975), was an American professional and collegiate basketball coach.  McCarthy was originally from Baldwyn, Mississippi. McCarthy may best be remembered for Mississippi State's appearance in the 1963 NCAA Men's Division I Basketball Tournament when his all-white team sneaked out of town in order to face Loyola University Chicago, which had four black starters.

In March 1975, McCarthy died as a result of colon cancer.

Early life
McCarthy was from Baldwyn, Mississippi, and played high school basketball at Tupelo Junior High School.  After high school he attended Mississippi State University where he was a member of Sigma Pi fraternity.  He did not play college basketball.  He served in the Air Force and then began coaching high school basketball at his alma mater in 1947.  He was recalled to the Air Force for the Korean War and coached an Air Force team in Memphis, Tennessee, to third place in an Air Force tournament.  After the Air Force he officiated SEC games before becoming the Mississippi State coach in 1955.

College career
McCarthy first came to fame for his 10-year stint at Mississippi State, where his teams won 169 games, lost 85, and won four Southeastern Conference (SEC) titles (three outright, one shared). While coaching at MSU he was named SEC Coach of the year three times. When he left Mississippi State he was the school's all-time leader in wins but has since been passed by Richard Williams and Rick Stansbury.

McCarthy may best be remembered for his team crossing the color line in the segregated South of the 1960s. Even before it was certain that Mississippi State would face Loyola and their four black starters, racist elements in the Mississippi media got into the act. On Thursday, March 7, 1963, the Jackson Daily News printed a picture of Loyola's starters to show that four of them were African Americans. As a caption to the picture, Daily News editor Jimmy Ward wrote that "readers may desire to clip the photo of the Loyola team and mail it today to the board of trustees of the institution of higher learning" to prevent the game from taking place.  At the time, a longstanding state policy barred college teams at state schools from playing games against racially integrated teams.  The Bulldogs had been forced to turn down three previous NCAA Tournament bids for this reason, including when they won their first two outright SEC titles in school history.

The editorials were in response to the decision by Mississippi State President Dean W. Colvard's March 2, 1963, to accept the automatic bid to the NCAA Tournament as outright SEC champions.  The College Board of Mississippi met on March 9, 1963, and upheld Colvard's decision. But on March 13, just a day before the team was scheduled to travel to East Lansing, state senator Billy Mitts and former state senator B. W. Lawson sought and obtained a temporary injunction against the team leaving the state.

While sheriffs were on their way to Starkville, Mississippi, to serve the injunction, the team was participating in a pep rally the night before their departure, where effigies of state senators Mitts and Lawson were hung. The team's original plan was to leave Starkville at 8:30 a.m. on Thursday morning. But learning that sheriffs would be expected to arrive in town at 11:30 p.m. Wednesday night, MSU put their sophisticated contingency plan into effect.

McCarthy, the athletic director, and the assistant athletic director drove to Memphis, and then flew to Nashville. The team itself sent the freshman squad to the airport as scheduled-posing as the varsity team. The real varsity team hid in a dorm on campus. The next morning, they boarded a private plane at the airport and flew to Nashville to meet the coach and team officials. From Nashville, the whole group took a commercial flight to the game at East Lansing, Michigan. These events were chronicled in the DVD One Night in March produced by Starkville-based Broadcast Media Group

McCarthy Gymnasium on the campus of MSU was named for him in 1975.

McCarthy later coached the George Washington University's men's basketball team, going 9–18 with the Colonials in 1966–1967.

Head coaching record

College

ABA career
In the American Basketball Association, McCarthy coached the New Orleans Buccaneers from 1967 to 1970, the Memphis Pros from 1970 to 1972, the Dallas Chaparrals for the 1972–73 season, and the Kentucky Colonels in the 1973–1974 season. He was named ABA coach of the year for the 73–74 season. In the 1967–68 season he led the team to victories over the Denver Rockets and Dallas Chaparrals before losing the finals in seven games to the Pittsburgh Pipers. He was named ABA coach of the year in 1969 and 1974. He was the first ABA coach to win 200 games.

Babe-isms
McCarthy was known as "Ol' Magnolia Mouth" (or just "Magnolia Mouth") for his cement-thick Mississippi accent and short, funny phrases called Babe-isms. A few of the more famous and often used Babe-isms were:

Boy, I gotta tell you, you gotta come out at 'em like a bitin' sow.

My old pappy used to tell me the sun don't shine on the same dog's butt every day.

Why panic at five in the mornin' because it's still dark out? 

Now, let's cloud up and rain all over 'em.

References

External links

 Basketball-reference.com

1923 births
1975 deaths
United States Air Force personnel of the Korean War
Basketball coaches from Mississippi
Dallas Chaparrals head coaches
George Washington Colonials men's basketball coaches
Kentucky Colonels coaches
Memphis Sounds coaches
Military personnel from Mississippi
Mississippi State Bulldogs men's basketball coaches
Mississippi State University alumni
New Orleans Buccaneers coaches
People from Baldwyn, Mississippi
 deaths from cancer in Mississippi
Deaths from colorectal cancer